This is a list of years in television. It lists some important events in the history of television, as well as the first broadcasts of many television shows, and the launches of some television channels and networks.

1870s
  1876: Alexander Graham Bell invents the telephone.
  1877: Bell Telephone Company is founded.

1920s
  1922: Charles Francis Jenkins' first public demonstration of television principles. A set of static photographic pictures is transmitted from Washington, D.C. to the Navy station NOF in Anacostia by telephone wire, and then wirelessly back to Washington.
Philo Farnsworth first describes an image dissector tube, which uses cesium to produce images electronically, but will not produce a working model until 1927.
  1923: Charles Jenkins first demonstrates "true" television with moving images. This time 48-line moving silhouette images are transmitted at 16 frames per second from Washington to Anacostia Navy station.
Vladimir Zworykin applies for a patent for an all-electronic television system, the first ancestor of the electric scanning television camera. The patent is not granted until 1938 after significant revisions and patent interference actions.
  1924: John Logie Baird demonstrates a semi-mechanical television system with the transmission of moving silhouette images in England. 
Vladimir Zworykin files a patent application for the kinescope, a television picture receiver tube. Metro-Goldwyn-Mayer is formed.
  1925: John Logie Baird performs the first public demonstration of his "televisor" at the Selfridges department store on London's Oxford Street.
Charles Francis Jenkins achieves the first synchronized transmission of a moving silhouette (shadowgraphs) and sound, using 48 lines, and a mechanical system.
Vladimir Zworykin applies for a patent for color television.
Zworykin first demonstrates his electric camera tube and receiver for Westinghouse corporation executives, transmitting the still image of an "X".
John Baird achieves the first live television image with tone graduations (not silhouette or duotone images) in his laboratory. Baird brings office boy William Taynton in front of the camera to become the first face televised.
  1926: John Logie Baird demonstrates the world's first television system to transmit live moving images with tone graduations, to 40 members of the Royal Institution.
  1927: The BBC begins broadcasting as the British Broadcasting Corporation under the Royal Charter.
  1928: John Logie Baird's Television Development Company demonstrates their model A, B, and C 'televisors' to the general public.
  1929: John Logie Baird begins broadcasting 30-minute-long programmes for his mechanically scanned televisions.

1930s
  1930: Baird installs a television at 10 Downing Street, London, the British Prime Minister's residence. On July 14, Prime Minister Ramsay MacDonald and his family use it to watch the first-ever television drama, The Man with the Flower in His Mouth.
  1931: Allen B. DuMont perfects long-lasting reliable cathode-ray tubes later used for television reception. TV reaches the Soviet Union and France.
  1932: The BBC starts a regular public television broadcasting service in the UK.
  1933: The first television revue, Looking In, is broadcast on the BBC. The musical revue featured the Paramount Astoria dancing girls. Broadcast live by the BBC using John Logie Baird's 30-line mechanical television system, part of this performance was recorded onto a 7" aluminum disc using a primitive home recording process called Silvatone. This footage, which runs to just under four minutes, is the oldest surviving recording of broadcast television.
  1934: The Three Stooges, Philo Farnsworth demonstrates a non-mechanical television system. The agreement for joint experimental transmissions by the BBC and John Logie Baird's company comes to an end. First 30 Line Mechanical Television Test Transmissions commence in April in Brisbane Australia conducted by Thomas Elliott and Dr. Val McDowall.
  1935: First regular scheduled TV broadcasts in Germany by the TV Station Paul Nipkow. The final transmissions of John Logie Baird's 30-line television system are broadcast by the BBC. First TV broadcasts in France on February 13 on Paris PTT Vision.
  1936: The 1936 Summer Olympics becomes the first Olympic Games to be broadcast on television.
  1937: The BBC Television Service broadcasts the world's first televised Shakespeare play, a thirty-minute version of Twelfth Night, and the first football match, Arsenal F.C. vs. Arsenal reserves.
  1938: DuMont Laboratories manufactures and sells the first all-electronic television sets to the public. Baird gives the first public demonstration of color projection television. The BBC broadcasts the world's first-ever television science fiction (R.U.R.), and television crime series (Telecrime); in one of the lengthiest experimental television broadcasts, the BBC broadcasts a 90-minute version of Edmond Rostand's Cyrano de Bergerac, starring Leslie Banks, Constance Cummings, and James Mason.
  1939: The BBC suspends its television service owing to the outbreak of the Second World War. The 1939 New York World's Fair was broadcast. Japan is the first Asian country to air television.

1940s
 1940: The American Federal Communications Commission, (FCC), holds public hearings about television
 1941: First television advertisements aired. The first official, paid television advertisement was broadcast in the United States on July 1, 1941, over New York station WNBT (now WNBC) before a baseball game between the Brooklyn Dodgers and the Philadelphia Phillies. The announcement was for Bulova watches.
 1942: FCC terminates all American television broadcasting because of the war; DuMont petitions FCC to resume broadcasting and receives approval.
 1943: Hänsel und Gretel is the first complete opera to be broadcast on television, but only in New York; first (experimental) telecast of Charles Dickens's A Christmas Carol. Many more telecasts of the story will follow in later years, but until film begins to be used on television, no two of the television versions of the story will have the same casts. An advertisement campaign about forest fires introduces Smokey Bear
 1944: American Broadcasting Company, (ABC), is formed.
 1945: National Broadcasting Company (NBC) begins the first regularly scheduled television network service in the United States.
 1946: RCA demonstrates all-electronic color television system; the DuMont Television Network begins broadcasting.
 1947: First broadcast of Howdy Doody, Kraft Television Theatre, A Diamond is Forever (De Beers) and Meet the Press; the World Series is broadcast live for the first time; the 1947 Tournament of Roses Parade becomes the first televised parade. 
 1948: First broadcast of The Ed Sullivan Show and Texaco Star Theater; the Macy's Thanksgiving Day Parade moves from radio to television
 1949: First broadcast of The Lone Ranger, Crusader Rabbit and Mama; 1st Emmy Awards

1950s
 1950: First broadcast of Come Dancing, Broadway Open House, Your Show of Shows and What's My Line?; Cuba is the first Caribbean country to receive TV; Brazil is the first South American country to receive TV; Nielsen Media Research begins to provide television ratings data; Jack Benny and Burns & Allen move from radio to TV; Looney Tunes and Merrie Melodies cartoons begin airing on television after previously only being theatrical short films; Bob Hope appears in his first TV special.
 1951: The first broadcast of live United States transcontinental television takes place in San Francisco, California during the Japanese Peace Treaty Conference. The first broadcast of I Love Lucy, See It Now, Dragnet, the Hallmark Hall of Fame, Search for Tomorrow, Sua vida me pertence, Love of Life and The Roy Rogers Show; the Code of Practices for Television Broadcasters is first issued.
 1952: First broadcast of Today (NBC), This Is Your Life, Adventures of Superman, Omnibus, and Flower Pot Men; Canada begins receiving TV; first appearance of Tony the Tiger (Kellogg's Frosted Flakes); Hockey Night in Canada and The Guiding Light move from radio to TV
 1953: The first broadcast of Panorama, Make Room for Daddy, Kōhaku Uta Gassen; the coronation of Elizabeth II is the first ceremony of its kind to be broadcast on television. The Academy Awards ceremony (the Oscars) is televised for the first time after previously being broadcast by radio, beginning in 1930. TV Guide is founded. The first "TV dinner" is made by C.A. Swanson & Sons.
 1954: First broadcast of The Tonight Show, Father Knows Best, Marlboro Man, Disneyland, The Jolly Green Giant and Lassie; NTSC video standard for color television is introduced, and National Educational Television (NET) is launched.
 1955: First broadcast of The Phil Silvers Show, The Honeymooners, The Mickey Mouse Club, Alfred Hitchcock Presents, Sunday Night at the London Palladium, The Benny Hill Show, The Sooty Show, The Adventures of Robin Hood, Gunsmoke and Captain Kangaroo; ITV launches in the UK; millions of viewers watch the grand opening of Disneyland in California.
 1956: First broadcast of The Edge of Night, As the World Turns, The Price Is Right, The Tipps Family (PG Tips), Playhouse 90, the Eurovision Song Contest and Hancock's Half Hour
 1957: First broadcast of Perry Mason, Wagon Train, Have Gun — Will Travel, Leave It to Beaver, Maverick, Senda prohibida, and Carosello; Hanna-Barbera is founded (as H-B Enterprises, Inc.)
 1958: First broadcast of Blue Peter, Peter Gunn, The Rifleman, Wanted Dead or Alive, Quatermass and the Pit, The Donna Reed Show, 77 Sunset Strip, Moonlight Mask, Naked City and The Huckleberry Hound Show; the quiz show scandals wipe out The $64,000 Question and Twenty-One.
 1959: First broadcast of The Twilight Zone, Dennis the Menace, Telejornal, The Quick Draw McGraw Show, Rocky and Bullwinkle and Friends, Think Small (Volkswagan), The Untouchables, Rawhide, the first-ever Barbie commercial, and Bonanza (which runs for fourteen years); First appearances of the Trix Rabbit and Snap, Crackle and Pop (Rice Krispies); The second Grammy Awards ceremony is the first Grammy Awards to be televised and Nigeria is the first African country to receive TV.

1960s
 1960: First broadcast of My Three Sons, The Andy Griffith Show, Route 66, The Flintstones, Coronation Street and Tales of the Riverbank; Rankin/Bass Productions, Inc. is founded (as Videocraft International, Ltd.). American presidential candidates John F. Kennedy and Richard M. Nixon debate live on television.
 1961: First broadcast of The Dick Van Dyke Show, The Yogi Bear Show, The Avengers, The Defenders, Hazel, The Americans, Mister Ed, The Alvin Show, The Morecambe and Wise Show and Car 54, Where Are You?; First appearance of The Milky Bar Kid
 1962: First broadcast of The Beverly Hillbillies, The Virginian, McHale's Navy, Steptoe and Son, The Jetsons, The Saint, University Challenge, Wally Gator, Elgar, That Was The Week That Was, The Late Late Show (Ireland) and Sábado Gigante; first airing of "Everyone Loves a Slinky"; first satellite television relayed by Telstar.
 1963: First broadcast of Doctor Who, General Hospital, My Favorite Martian, The Fugitive, Petticoat Junction, Astro Boy, We Try Harder (Avis) and The Outer Limits; American Cable Systems is founded; Martin Luther King Jr. addresses his famous I Have a Dream speech to the world; The world watches in horror over the Assassination of John F. Kennedy.
 1964: First broadcast of Gilligan's Island, The Munsters, Bewitched, The Man from U.N.C.L.E, The Addams Family, Peter Potamus, Gomer Pyle, U.S.M.C., Top of the Pops, Rudolph the Red-Nosed Reindeer, Magilla Gorilla, Underdog, Match of the Day, Jeopardy!, Jonny Quest and the Up series; First appearance of Lucky the Leprechaun (Lucky Charms); The controversial political advertisement "Daisy" airs only once, but is later considered to be an important factor in Lyndon B. Johnson's landslide victory over Barry Goldwater in the 1964 United States presidential election, and an important turning point in political and advertising history; Broadcast of U.S. president Lyndon Johnson signing the Civil Rights Act Of 1964; The Beatles appear on The Ed Sullivan Show.
 1965: First broadcast of I Dream of Jeannie, Days of Our Lives, Atom Ant, Get Smart, The Big Valley, The New 3 Stooges, Secret Squirrel, Thunderbirds, The Dean Martin Show, My Mother the Car, Hogan's Heroes, Lost in Space, The Wild Wild West, Till Death Us Do Part, Gidget, Kimba the White Lion, Roger Ramjet, Green Acres, Peanuts, Des chiffres et des lettres, Tomorrow's World, The Magic Roundabout and The War Game; Tom and Jerry cartoons begin to be aired on television after previously only being theatrical short films; the first appearance of the Pillsbury Doughboy.
 1966: First broadcast of Star Trek, Batman (the live-action TV series starring Adam West), Space Ghost, The Time Tunnel, The Monkees, Dark Shadows, Happiness is a cigar called Hamlet, Ultra Series, Family Affair, Osomatsu-kun, How the Grinch Stole Christmas!, That Girl, Cathy Come Home and Mission: Impossible; England win the World Cup Final, seen by tens of millions, NBC becomes the first network to air their entire schedule in color.
 1967: First broadcast of The Carol Burnett Show, The Prisoner, Frankenstein Jr. and The Impossibles, The Flying Nun, News at Ten, Ironside, F Troop, Captain Birdseye, Speed Racer, Spider-Man, Princess Knight, George of the Jungle, Mannix, The Phil Donahue Show and Ambassador Magma; PAL and SECAM colour standards introduced in Europe, with BBC2 making their first colour broadcasts.
 1968: First broadcast of 60 Minutes, The Mod Squad, One Life to Live, Dad's Army, Julia, Columbo, Elvis, Here's Lucy, Wacky Races, Mister Rogers' Neighborhood, The Archie Show, The Banana Splits, Hawaii Five-O, Rowan & Martin's Laugh-In and Adam-12; the first appearance of the Keebler Elves and Cadbury's Milk Tray Man
 1969: First broadcast of Sesame Street, Scooby-Doo, Where Are You!, The Pink Panther Show, Love, American Style, Sazae-san, Monty Python's Flying Circus, Room 222, Marcus Welby, M.D., On the Buses, The Brady Bunch, Marine Boy; completion of Fernsehturm Berlin; The Apollo 11 Moon landing is broadcast live worldwide.

1970s
 1970: First broadcast of The Mary Tyler Moore Show, The Flip Wilson Show Josie and the Pussycats, McCloud, Ashita no Joe, The Partridge Family, Night Gallery, The Odd Couple, The Adventures of Hutch the Honeybee, The Adventures of Rupert Bear and All My Children; PBS is launched.
 1971: First broadcast of All in the Family, Cannon, The Cat in the Hat (TV special), Kamen Rider, The Old Grey Whistle Test, The Funky Phantom, Chespirito, The Two Ronnies, McDonaldland, Lupin the Third, Upstairs, Downstairs, Help!... It's the Hair Bear Bunch!, La Linea, The Generation Game and Parkinson. DIC Enterprises is founded. Chesapeake Television Corporation is founded.
 1972: First broadcast of M*A*S*H, Emmerdale, Emergency!, Mastermind, Kamiondžije, El Chavo, Rainbow, Sanford And Son, Fat Albert and the Cosby Kids, The New Scooby-Doo Movies, El Chapulín Colorado, The Bob Newhart Show, Mazinger Z, Science Ninja Team Gatchaman, Great Performances and Maude; First appearance of Little Mikey (Quaker's Life Cereal); HBO is launched. Warner Communications is founded.
 1973: First broadcast of Boy on the Bike (Hovis), The Ascent of Man, Moonbase 3, The Wombles, Barnaby Jones, The Addams Family, Super Friends, The New Perry Mason, The Young and the Restless, Cutie Honey, An American Family, Bailey's Comets, Inch High, Private Eye, Ein Herz und eine Seele, Schoolhouse Rock!, Kojak, Speed Buggy, The Midnight Special, Star Trek: The Animated Series, Seventeen Moments of Spring, Tetley Tea Folk, Last of the Summer Wine and The World at War; First appearances of Quicky the Nesquik Bunny and the Duracell Bunny.
 1974: First broadcast of Chico and the Man, Derrick, Happy Days, Little House on the Prairie, Mio Mao, Kolchak: The Night Stalker, Hong Kong Phooey, Police Woman, Space Battleship Yamato, Heidi, Girl of the Alps, Bagpuss, Land of the Lost, Porridge, Smash Martians, Rhoda, Good Times, The Rockford Files, and Tiswas; First appearance of the Kool-Aid Man; 1st Daytime Emmy Awards; Richard M. Nixon announces his resignation on live television.
 1975: First broadcast of Starsky & Hutch, Baretta, The Great Grape Ape Show, Barney Miller, Fawlty Towers, Good Morning America, One Day at a Time, Paddington Bear, Super Sentai, Saturday Night Live, Sneak Previews, Space: 1999, The Jeffersons, The Naked Civil Servant, Welcome Back, Kotter, Wheel of Fortune and Wonder Woman; Sony introduces the Betamax home video tape recorder.
 1976: First broadcast of The Muppet Show, The Bionic Woman, Jabberjaw, I, Claudius, Grlom u jagode, Honey Monster (Sugar Puffs), Loriot, SCTV, Austin City Limits, Quincy M.E., The Young Doctors, C.P.O. Sharkey, Andrex Puppy, Charlie's Angels, Family Feud, The Gong Show, Alice, Jabberjaw, Laverne and Shirley What's Happening!!,  and Nuts in May; Cookie Jar Group is founded; completion of CN Tower; the first VHSs and videocassette recorders (VCRs) go on sale.
 1977: First broadcast of Abigail's Party, CHiPs, Eight Is Enough, The Love Boat, ¿Qué Pasa, USA?, Roots, Soap, It'll Be Alright on the Night, Captain Caveman and the Teen Angels, Yatterman, Lou Grant, The Return of the Spirit, Hungarian Folktales, Three's Company, Top Gear and Live from the Met; first appearance of Cadbury's Caramel Bunny. CBN Satellite Service is launched.
 1978: First broadcast of An Ordinary Miracle, Abarembo Shogun, Battlestar Galactica, Dallas, Diff'rent Strokes, WKRP in Cincinnati, Galaxy Express 999, Space Pirate Captain Harlock, Once Upon a Time..., The Incredible Hulk, The Dating Game, Ski Sunday, Fantasy Island, Grange Hill, Matador, Mork & Mindy, Pennies from Heaven, Taxi, Future Boy Conan and Deeply Regretted By...
 1979: First broadcast of Doraemon, Benson, Blue Remembered Hills, Buck Rogers in the 25th Century, Hart to Hart, Knots Landing, Seibu Keisatsu, Life on Earth, Anne of Green Gables, Trapper John, M.D., Antiques Roadshow, Los Ricos También Lloran, Mobile Suit Gundam, Archie Bunker's Place, Real People, Worzel Gummidge, The Dukes of Hazzard, The Facts of Life, BuzzBee the Honey Nut Cheerios Bee, The Plastic Man Comedy/Adventure Show, The Rose of Versailles, You Can't Do That on Television, The Meeting Place Cannot Be Changed, The Very Same Munchhausen and Tinker, Tailor, Soldier, Spy; ESPN and Nickelodeon are launched.

1980s
 1980: First broadcast of Astro Boy, Richie Rich, Berlin Alexanderplatz, The Bund, Bosom Buddies, It's a Living, Magnum PI, Nightline, BBC Children in Need, Vruć vetar, The Kids of Degrassi Street, Sanford, Strumpet City Too Close For Comfort, and Yes Minister; Cable News Network (CNN) and The Learning Channel (TLC) are launched. DISH Network is founded (as EchoStar). News Corporation is founded (as News Corp Limited).
 1981: First broadcast of The Smurfs, Hill Street Blues, Urusei Yatsura, Dr. Slump, The People's Court, Gimme a Break, Wetten, dass..?, Dynasty, Greatest American Hero, Postman Pat, Danger Mouse, Spider-Man (1981 TV series), Spider-Man and His Amazing Friends, Elvira's Movie Macabre, Falcon Crest, Only Fools and Horses and Brideshead Revisited; MTV launched; hundreds of millions watch the Wedding of Charles, Prince of Wales and Lady Diana Spencer; First appearance of Absolut Bottle (Absolut Vodka) and "Pardon me, do you have any Grey Poupon?". A writers' strike disrupts U.S. television for three months.
 1982: First broadcast of Cheers, Knight Rider, Silver Spoons, Family Ties, Countdown, Remington Steele, Cagney & Lacey, Brookside, The Mysterious Cities of Gold, Chiquilladas, Super Dimension Fortress Macross, The Snowman, Boys from the Blackstuff, Newhart and St. Elsewhere; Channel 4 (UK) and The Weather Channel launched. Adobe Systems Incorporated is founded.
 1983: First broadcast of The A-Team, Mama's Family, The Day After, V (original miniseries), 1984 (Apple Computers), Webster, Captain Tsubasa, He-Man and the Masters of the Universe, Inspector Gadget, Fraggle Rock, Oshin, Auf Wiedersehen, Pet, Reading Rainbow, Press Your Luck, G.I. Joe: A Real American Hero, Alvin and the Chipmunks, Kinnikuman, Eddie Murphy Delirious, The Joy of Painting, An Englishman Abroad, J. R. Hartley (Yellow Pages), The Legend of the Condor Heroes, Blackadder and Terrahawks; Southwestern Bell Corporation is founded; Disney Channel is launched.
 1984: First broadcast of Thomas the Tank Engine and Friends, Fist of the North Star, Airwolf, Blue Thunder, Murder, She Wrote, Miami Vice, Charles in Charge, Punky Brewster, Who's the Boss?, Top lista nadrealista, The Cosby Show, The Transformers, Voltron, Night Court, Tales from the Darkside, Where's the beef? (Wendy's), Muppet Babies, La piovra, Santa Barbara, Spitting Image, Heimat and The Jewel in the Crown; A&E and Canal+ launched.
 1985: First broadcast of MacGyver, Growing Pains, ThunderCats, Neighbours, Mr. Belvedere, Moonlighting, 227, Larry King Live, Edge of Darkness, The Max Headroom Show, EastEnders, Disney's Adventures of the Gummi Bears What's Happening Now!!, and The Golden Girls; the Discovery Channel is established; the first WrestleMania event is broadcast; millions watch the Live Aid concert from Wembley Stadium.
 1986: First broadcast of L.A. Law, The Oprah Winfrey Show, Perfect Strangers, Double Dare, Matlock, Head of the Class, Designing Women, Chester Cheetah (Cheetos), ALF, Amen, Malgudi Days, Ginga: Nagareboshi Gin, Casualty, Saint Seiya, The Scottish Widow (Scottish Widows), London's Burning, Takeshi's Castle, Dragon Ball, The Noid (Domino's Pizza), Vasko de Gama from Rupcha Village, Alternatywy 4, first My Pet Monster commercial, Pee-wee's Playhouse, The California Raisins, The Singing Detective and Pingu; the Fox Broadcasting Company is launched; television is introduced in Mayotte and Niue.
 1987: First broadcast of Full House, Married... with Children, Teenage Mutant Ninja Turtles, DuckTales, Hello Kitty's Furry Tale Theater, Headbangers Ball, Square One TV, Thirtysomething, ChuckleVision, Kimagure Orange Road, City Hunter, A Different World, Degrassi Junior High, Ramayan, Fireman Sam, My Two Dads,  Inspector Morse, The Bold and the Beautiful, Star Trek: The Next Generation, The Tracey Ullman Show and 21 Jump Street (TV series); First airing of This is Your Brain on Drugs; The Travel Channel is launched.
 1988: First broadcast of Roseanne, Mystery Science Theater 3000, Red Dwarf, In the Heat of the Night, Just Do It (Nike), Murphy Brown, Yo! MTV Raps, Count Duckula, A Pup Named Scooby-Doo, Garfield and Friends, Legend of the Galactic Heroes, Anpanman, Oishinbo, Unsolved Mysteries, America's Most Wanted, The Wonder Years and Mahabharat; TNT (Turner Network Television) is launched; the first LCD televisions go on sale; a writers' strike disrupts U.S. television for five months.
 1989: First broadcast of The Simpsons, Seinfeld, Family Matters, The Super Mario Bros. Super Show!, The Legend of Zelda, Doogie Howser, M.D., Baywatch, Chip 'n Dale Rescue Rangers, Saved By The Bell, Degrassi High, American Gladiators, Wallace and Gromit, Hey Dude, Face (British Airways), America's Funniest Home Videos, Quantum Leap, COPS, The Laughing Salesman, Agatha Christie's Poirot, Shining Time Station, Coach and Inside Edition; CNBC and Eurosport launched. Doctor Who is cancelled after running for 26 years.

1990s
 1990: First broadcast of Tiny Toon Adventures, The Adventures of Super Mario Bros. 3, Mr. Bean, Blossom, The Fresh Prince of Bel-Air, MasterChef (original UK version), Twin Peaks, Law & Order, Are You Afraid of the Dark?, Ching Roi Ching Lan, Beverly Hills, 90210, Wings, In Living Color, Chibi Maruko-chan, Kyatto Ninden Teyandee, Bobby's World, The Family of Mr Shalash, Nadia: The Secret of Blue Water, Art Attack, TaleSpin, and Northern Exposure. First appearance of the "I've Fallen and I Can't Get Up!" advertisement for Life Alert. Fox Kids is launched.
 1991: First broadcast of Home Improvement, Clarissa Explains It All, Dinosaurs, Darkwing Duck, Roc, Step By Step, Nummer 28, Papa and Nicole (Renault), The Julekalender, Æon Flux, the first three Nicktoons (Doug, Rugrats, and The Ren & Stimpy Show), Super Mario World, Magical Princess Minky Momo, The Red Green Show, Maury, The Jerry Springer Show, and A Bunch of Munsch.
 1992: First broadcast of The Larry Sanders Show, Mad About You, Batman: The Animated Series, Goof Troop, Barney & Friends, California Dreams, Martin, Nickelodeon Guts, The Real World, Cha Cha Cha, Crayon Shin-chan, YuYu Hakusho, Bananas in Pyjamas, The Golden Palace, Hanging with Mr. Cooper, Melrose Place, X-Men, The Animals of Farthing Wood, Absolutely Fabulous, Dateline NBC, Sailor Moon; Cartoon Network is launched, with Boomerang as one of its programming blocks. The Faith and Values Channel is launched.
 1993: First broadcast of Late Show with David Letterman, Animaniacs, Dave's World, Rocko's Modern Life, Adventures of Sonic the Hedgehog, Sonic the Hedgehog (a.k.a. "Sonic SatAM"), The Adventures of Pete & Pete, This Hour Has 22 Minutes, The X-Files, Beavis and Butt-Head, The Pink Panther (TV series), Mighty Morphin Power Rangers, Got Milk?, Grace Under Fire, WWF Monday Night Raw, Walker, Texas Ranger, Slam Dunk, Boy Meets World, Dr. Quinn, Medicine Woman, SWAT Kats: The Radical Squadron, Bill Nye the Science Guy, Cracker, seaQuest DSV, Living Single, The Nanny, Ricki Lake, Saved By The Bell: The New Class, Star Trek: Deep Space Nine, and Frasier. Mnet is launched.
 1994: First broadcast of Friends, Party of Five, Ellen (TV series), The Kingdom, Chicago Hope, Babylon 5, The National Lottery Draws, Inside the Actors Studio, Sister Sister, Space Ghost Coast to Coast, Spider-Man, The Tick, ER, Gargoyles, All That, Allegra's Window and Gullah Gullah Island; FUNimation Productions is founded; Turner Classic Movies is launched; Discovery Civilization Network: The World History and Geography Channel is launched. Several TV stations in the US switch their affiliates until 1996. TMN Moviepix and Starz are launched. Destination America is launched (as  Discovery Travel & Living Network). Home & Garden Television (HGTV) is launched. DirecTV is founded. Adobe Flash is released (as FutureWave).
 1995: First broadcast of Star Trek: Voyager, Caroline in the City Neon Genesis Evangelion, Father Ted, In the House (TV series), NileCity 105,6, The Jeff Foxworthy Show, The Parent Hood, The Wayans Bros., Little Bear, Pinky and the Brain, Xena: Warrior Princess, The Late Late Show, WCW Monday Nitro, Road Rules, The Drew Carey Show, Budweiser Frogs, Mad TV, NewsRadio, Hang Time (TV series) JAG, El y Ella, Sevcec; The programme Rox makes a move to the Internet, becoming the first-ever web series; The History Channel, Kids' WB and Tooniverse are launched; The communications satellite EchoStar I is (literally) launched; first appearance of the M&M's Spokescandies and the "Holidays are Coming" Coca-Cola ad campaign; The O. J. Simpson murder trial is televised.
 1996: First broadcast of The Crocodile Hunter, Clueless, Dexter's Laboratory, Cosby, 3rd Rock from the Sun, Waynehead, C Bear and Jamal, 7th Heaven, Blue's Clues, Hey Arnold!, Sabrina the Teenage Witch, Sparks, Spin City, Suddenly Susan, Kenan and Kel, Malcolm & Eddie, The Daily Show, Moesha, E! True Hollywood Story, Judge Judy, Churchill Nodding Dog, Arthur, Our Friends in the North, The Steve Harvey Show, The Jamie Foxx Show, The Sculptress, Everybody Loves Raymond, Superman: The Animated Series, Beast Wars: Transformers and Detective Conan; Fox News is launched; the first high-definition television broadcasts; the first DVDs and DVD players go on sale. Animal Planet is launched. Discovery Kids Channel is launched.
 1997: First broadcast of South Park, Pokémon, Berserk, King of the Hill, Cow and Chicken, City Guys, Dharma & Greg, Just Shoot Me Teletubbies, Franklin, Caillou, Bear in the Big Blue House, Stargate SG-1, Men in Black: The Series, Buffy the Vampire Slayer, Rachel Leigh Cook's Brain on Drugs, Todd MacFarlane's Spawn, Recess, Alles Kan Beter, Smart Guy, Sasuke, Shoujo Kakumei Utena, Daria, and I'm Alan Partridge; first appearance of the Taco Bell Chihuahua and Priceless (Mastercard); The TV Parental Guidelines television content rating system is introduced; Playhouse Disney is launched; Cartoon Network introduces Toonami; Netflix is founded; the first plasma televisions go on sale; 685 children across Japan are taken to hospitals from seizures caused by a Pokémon episode; millions watch the funeral of Princess Diana.
 1998: First broadcast of Who Wants to Be a Millionaire?, The Wiggles, Oggy and the Cockroaches, Dawson's Creek, Will & Grace, Becker, Charmed, Cowboy Bebop, That '70s Show, Bob the Builder, CatDog, Sex and the City, The Powerpuff Girls, Godzilla: The Series, Elmo's World, Rolie Polie Olie, PB&J Otter, Out of the Box, Khakis Swing (GAP Inc.), WCW Thunder, The Royle Family, and The King of Queens; Kingston Communications launches the first major video-on-demand service. VeggieTales airs on television for the first time with the special VeggieTales Christmas Spectacular! on ION TV.
 1999: First broadcast of Family Guy, The Sopranos, Crashbox, SpongeBob SquarePants, Station Zero, Ed, Edd n Eddy, Futurama, Batman Beyond, Sonic Underground, Digimon: Digital Monsters, One Piece, The Parkers, The West Wing, Whassup? (Budweiser), Spider-Man Unlimited, Downtown, Courage the Cowardly Dog, Little Bill, WWF Smackdown, The Amanda Show, 3000 Whys of Blue Cat, Big Brother (Netherlands), Walking with Prehistoric Life, Yo soy Betty, la fea, Surfer (Guinness), Freaks and Geeks, Trick, Angel, Zoboomafoo and Dragon Tales; first appearance of the GEICO Gecko; DIY Network is launched; the first digital video recorders (DVRs) go on sale, one of them being TiVo. OCN is launched.

2000s
 2000: First broadcast of Malcolm in the Middle, CSI: Crime Scene Investigation, Curb Your Enthusiasm, MTV Cribs, Survivor, Jackass, Bear Fight (John West Foods), Da Ali G Show, Halifax Singing Staff, 106 & Park, Just for Laughs: Gags, Dora the Explorer, Clifford the Big Red Dog, Star Trek: Enterprise, Aqua Teen Hunger Force, Static Shock, Transformers: Robots in Disguise, Buzz Lightyear of Star Command, Homestar Runner, and Gilmore Girls. Nickelodeon on CBS is launched. Boomerang is launched as its own channel, separate from Cartoon Network. Billy Mays shoots an infomercial for OxiClean. The Foundation for a Better Life is founded.
 2001: First broadcast of 24, Scrubs, The Office (UK), Band of Brothers, Sangdo, Merchants of Joseon, The Secret Life of Us, Fear Factor, The Amazing Race, Angelina Ballerina, Invader Zim, One on One, Oswald, The Book of Pooh, Stanley, Degrassi: The Next Generation, Samurai Jack, Yu-Gi-Oh!, Lizzie McGuire, How It's Made, Smallville, Six Feet Under, The Fairly OddParents, The Grim Adventures of Billy and Mandy and Totally Spies!; The Walt Disney Company buys Fox Family Worldwide; Adult Swim, a nighttime programming block on Cartoon Network, is launched; The Faith and Values Channel relaunches as the Hallmark Channel; The world witnesses the September 11 terrorist attacks in New York City and Washington. Regular programming is suspended in order to bring up-to-date coverage of events relating to the attacks.
 2002: First broadcast of Naruto, American Idol, The Shield, City of Men, Kim Possible, Extreme Makeover, I'm a Celebrity... Get Me Out of Here!, 8 Simple Rules, The Adventures of Jimmy Neutron: Boy Genius, Madventures, Firefly, Ant and Dec's Saturday Night Takeaway, 100 Greatest Britons, Winter Sonata, Max and Ruby, Teamo Supremo, Mr. Bean: The Animated Series, Ghost in the Shell: Stand Alone Complex, Icons, Clone High, Spider-Man: The New Animated Series, George Lopez, Codename: Kids Next Door, Liberty's Kids, Endurance, The Wire, Transformers: Armada, What's New, Scooby-Doo? and Cyberchase. Discovery HD Theater, the first 24/7 high definition basic cable network, is launched. Nicktoons (the TV channel) is launched.
 2003: First broadcast of Two and a Half Men, One Tree Hill, Fullmetal Alchemist, Teen Titans, The O.C., That's So Raven, Cog (Honda), Chappelle's Show, Reno 911!, MythBusters, Dirty Jobs, Peugeot 206 Sculptor, Jojo's Circus, Rubbadubbers, Jakers! The Adventures of Piggley Winks, Red vs. Blue, NCIS, Jimmy Kimmel Live, My Life as a Teenage Robot, All In, Little Britain, Peep Show, Arrested Development, Los Serrano, The Ellen DeGeneres Show, The Venture Bros., Transformers: Energon, and Making Fiends (the web series); first appearance of Silhouette Style (iPod); Rooster Teeth Productions is founded.
 2004: First broadcast of Bleach, Peppa Pig, Drake & Josh, LazyTown, Miss Spider's Sunny Patch Friends, The Backyardigans, Toddworld, Winx Club, Maya & Miguel, Ned's Declassified School Survival Guide, Phil of the Future, House, Lost, Desperate Housewives, Battlestar Galactica, Ghost Hunters, Dog Whisperer with Cesar Millan, The Angry Video Game Nerd, Hassan and Habibah, Samurai Champloo, Sgt. Frog, Monster, Citroën C4 Dancing Robot, Super Girl, Veronica Mars, Entourage, Joey, The X Factor, Hell's Kitchen (UK), The Apprentice, Danny Phantom, Overhaulin', The Biggest Loser, Higglytown Heroes, Atomic Betty and Foster's Home for Imaginary Friends; first appearance of the GEICO Cavemen; Allstate begins its "Are you in good hands?" advertising campaign; Dove launches the Dove Campaign for Real Beauty; Jetix is launched; Euro1080 launches the first high-definition television broadcast.
 2005: First broadcast of Avatar: The Last Airbender, Sonic X, Time Warp Trio, It's Always Sunny In Philadelphia, Grey's Anatomy, Spiral, Noghtechin, Dancing with the Stars, My Name is Earl, The Closer, The Suite Life of Zack & Cody, Krypto the Superdog, Johnny Test, My Gym Partner's a Monkey, Camp Lazlo, noitulovE (Guinness), Survivorman, So You Think You Can Dance, Catscratch, Bones, Hell's Kitchen (US), MasterChef (independent international versions), The Colbert Report, How It Should Have Ended, Moral Orel, The Boondocks, Robot Chicken, American Dad!, Squidbillies, Erin Esurance, Everybody Hates Chris, The Office (U.S.), How I Met Your Mother, Criminal Minds, Zoey 101, Deal or No Deal, Go, Diego, Go!, Coconut Fred's Fruit Salad Island, Little Einsteins, Pocoyo, Pinky Dinky Doo, Carlton Draught: Big Ad, Supernatural, Prison Break, Pleasant Goat and Big Big Wolf, My Lovely Sam Soon, Sto Para Pente, Ben 10 and Puppy Bowl; PBS Kids Sprout is launched. The Doctor Who revival series begins, 16 years after the original show's cancellation in 1989. Toon Boom Harmony is released.
 2006: First broadcast of Death Note, High School Musical, Türkisch für Anfänger, Planet Earth, Man vs. Wild, Jumong, Heroes, Psych, Dancing on Ice, Dexter, Torchwood, Friday Night Lights, Ugly Betty, Hannah Montana, The Upside Down Show, El Hormiguero, Wow! Wow! Wubbzy!, Curious George, Fetch! with Ruff Ruffman, Happy Tree Friends, WordGirl, It's a Big Big World, Mickey Mouse Clubhouse, Handy Manny, Squirrel Boy, Class of 3000, Kappa Mikey, Wonder Pets, Fantastic Four: World's Greatest Heroes, Top Chef, The IT Crowd, Charlie Brooker's Screenwipe, Code Geass and 30 Rock; the Netherlands is the first country to move to digital television; France 24 launched; HD DVD and Blu-ray Disc launched;  First appearance of The Most Interesting Man in the World (Dos Equis). The WB and UPN shut down and merge to become The CW. BabyFirst is launched. Discovery Times is relaunched as Investigation Discovery (ID). AT&T U-verse is launched. Cocomelon is launched (as ThatsMEonTV). Crunchyroll is Launched. tvN is launched. Luxembourg becomes the first country to complete a wholesale switch from analog television to digital over-the-air (terrestrial television) broadcasting.
 2007: First broadcast of Bakugan Battle Brawlers, The Big Bang Theory, Britain's Got Talent, The Sarah Jane Adventures, Total Drama, My Friends Tigger & Pooh, Gossip Girl, iCarly, Captain Disillusion, Nostalgia Critic, Zero Punctuation, Heartland, Shaun the Sheep, The Naked Brothers Band, the John Lewis Christmas advert, Burn Notice, The Golden Path, Pushing Daisies, Monkey and Al (PG Tips), Wizards of Waverly Place, Super Why!, Wordworld, Phineas and Ferb, Yo Gabba Gabba!, Chowder, Transformers: Animated, Back at the Barnyard, Are You Smarter than a 5th Grader?, Golden Bride, The Killing, Chuck, Mad Men, Damages, and Storm Chasers; first appearance of Gorilla (Cadbury's Dairy Milk); a writers' strike shuts down U.S. scripted programming in November. Hulu is launched. CNN and YouTube sponsor U.S. presidential debates.
 2008: First broadcast of Breaking Bad, The Mentalist, Sons of Anarchy, Star Wars: The Clone Wars, The Spectacular Spider-Man, The Secret Saturdays, Speed Racer: The Next Generation, Iron Man: Armored Adventures, The Penguins of Madagascar, The Garfield Show, Making Fiends (the TV series), The Suite Life on Deck, Imagination Movers, Wipeout, Martha Speaks, Ni Hao, Kai-Lan, Sid the Science Kid, True Blood, Simon's Cat, Fringe, Dogs 101, Time Warp, Underbelly, The Inbetweeners, Radio Arvyla, 19 Kids and Counting, The Yogscast, Extra Credits, The Marvelous Misadventures of Flapjack, and Ben 10: Alien Force, and Hole in the Wall; First appearance of the Progressive Insurance mascot Flo; the launch of Discovery Channel's I Love the World ad campaign; the first 3D TV broadcasts; the historical miniseries John Adams premieres on HBO and wins a record-breaking thirteen Emmys. DIC Entertainment folds into Cookie Jar Group. Amazon Unbox is renamed to Amazon Instant Video on Demand.
 2009: First broadcast of Modern Family, Special Agent Oso, Jungle Junction, Zeke and Luther, Big Time Rush, The Fresh Beat Band, Aaron Stone, The Troop, The Super Hero Squad Show, Pawn Stars, American Ninja Warrior, Cake Boss, Tosh.0, Jersey Shore, Castle, Horrible Histories, Dinosaur Train, Cats 101, Compare the Meerkat, The Vampire Diaries, The Good Wife, Cougar Town, Archer, Toddlers and Tiaras, 16 and Pregnant, Late Night With Jimmy Fallon, The Middle, Glee, Parks and Recreation, Community, Misfits, Ancient Aliens, Monsters Inside Me, River Monsters, Annoying Orange, Fanboy and Chum Chum, and Equals Three; Discovery Kids Channel is re-launched as The Hub through a joint venture between Hasbro and Discovery, Inc.; Toon Disney is rebranded as Disney XD; Nick Jr. and TeenNick are launched; Cartoon Network introduces "CN Real", a block of live-action reality shows including Destroy Build Destroy.

2010s
 2010: First broadcast of Adventure Time, Regular Show, Fish Hooks, Team Umizoomi, Victorious, Sym-Bionic Titan, Scooby-Doo! Mystery Incorporated, Mad, Downton Abbey, Glass Home, Borgen, The Cat in the Hat Knows a Lot About That!, Sherlock, Solsidan, Pretty Little Liars, My Little Pony: Friendship Is Magic, Boardwalk Empire, Parenthood, Louie, Conan, The Great British Bake Off, Octonauts, Mike & Molly, Treme, Mysteries at the Museum, My Strange Addiction, Luther, Zevo-3, Storage Wars, Through the Wormhole, How the Universe Works, The Avengers: Earth's Mightiest Heroes, Young Justice, Transformers: Prime, Good Luck Charlie, Pair of Kings, Kick Buttowski, The Jungle Book, The Walking Dead, Sidekick, Ben 10: Ultimate Alien and The Voice (Holland); first airing of "The Man Your Man Could Smell Like" (Old Spice); Tonight Show conflict between Jay Leno and Conan O'Brien.
 2011: First broadcast of Game of Thrones, Black Mirror, Bob's Burgers, The Looney Tunes Show, Leyla ile Mecnun, Once Upon a Time, American Horror Story, The Killing, The Voice USA, Austin & Ally, Suits, Teen Wolf, Wild Kratts Jake and the Never Land Pirates, Justin Time, My Babysitter's a Vampire, Impractical Jokers, Brain Games, Tanked, Finding Bigfoot, Call of the Wildman, My Cat from Hell, Too Cute, The Amazing World of Gumball, Episodes, Secret Mountain Fort Awesome, The Problem Solverz, ThunderCats, LEGO Ninjago: Masters of Spinjitzu, Kung Fu Panda: Legends of Awesomeness, Last Man Standing, Shameless, Grimm, 2 Broke Girls, Game Theory (series), New Girl, Bubble Guppies, Homeland, Almost Naked Animals, A.N.T. Farm, Kickin' It, and Dan Vs.; State Farm premieres its "State of..." advertising campaign, which includes the "State of Unrest" commercial (a.k.a. "Jake from State Farm"); Discovery HD Theater is re-launched as Velocity; Disney Junior is launched; Oprah Winfrey Network (OWN) is launched; millions watch Prince William marry Kate Middleton; IBM's Watson competes against former champions Brad Rutter and Ken Jennings on Jeopardy!; The Yogscast formally incorporates as a company; Twitch is launched; President Obama announces the death of Osama bin Laden on live television.
 2012: First broadcast of Gravity Falls, Ultimate Spider-Man, Lab Rats, Dog with a Blog, Doc McStuffins, Marvin Marvin, Ben 10: Omniverse, The Legend of Korra, The High Fructose Adventures of Annoying Orange, Game Grumps, Did You Know Gaming?, JoJo's Bizarre Adventure, Sword Art Online, Duck Dynasty, Outrageous Acts of Science, Satyamev Jayate, Girls, Scandal, Nashville, Državni posao, Motu Patlu, Call the Midwife, Mystery Diners, Oliver Stone's Untold History of the United States, House of Lies, Veep, the Arrowverse, Catfish: The TV Show, Honest Trailers, The Mindy Project, Omar, Key & Peele, Daniel Tiger's Neighborhood, Kitchen, Hotel Impossible, Here Comes Honey Boo Boo, and My 600-lb Life; Overhaulin' receives a revival series. First appearance of Stressmannetje (De Lijn); The Red Bull Stratos jump; The 2012 London Olympics becomes the most-watched event of the year.
 2013: First broadcast of Attack on Titan, Rick and Morty, Steven Universe, Wander Over Yonder, Uncle Grandpa, Pac-Man and the Ghostly Adventures, Sam & Cat, Incredible Crew, Teen Titans Go!, PAW Patrol, Sofia the First, Henry Hugglemonster, Liv and Maddie, Sanjay and Craig, The Thundermans, The Haunted Hathaways, The Americans, Peaky Blinders, Avengers Assemble, Marvel's Agents of S.H.I.E.L.D., The Following, House of Cards, Bates Motel, Pakdam Pakdai, Gogglebox, Broadchurch, Hannibal, Vikings, Orange is the New Black, The Goldbergs and Brooklyn Nine-Nine; First appearance of Epic Split (Volvo Trucks) and Chicken (Mercedes Benz)
 2014: First broadcast of True Detective, Black-ish, Last Week Tonight with John Oliver, Fargo, BoJack Horseman, Gotham, Scorpion, Gomorrah, The 100, Outlander, Lucha Underground, Transparent, Broad City, Over the Garden Wall, Clarence, Sonic Boom, Star Wars Rebels, Blaze and the Monster Machines, Breadwinners, Silicon Valley, The Leftovers, Jane the Virgin, Chrisley Knows Best, Girl Meets World, I Didn't Do It, and Henry Danger; CBS All Access is launched; Twitch is bought by Amazon.
 2015: First broadcast of Better Call Saul, Star vs. the Forces of Evil, Game Shakers, Empire, Miraculous: Tales of Ladybug and Cat Noir, Narcos, Daredevil, Crazy Ex-Girlfriend, Trivago Girl, Lucifer, Life in Pieces, Fresh Off the Boat, Unbreakable Kimmy Schmidt, Love Island, Mr. Robot, Film Theory (series), Local 58, We Bare Bears, Harvey Beaks, Pig Goat Banana Cricket, Supernoobs, Shimmer and Shine, Guardians of the Galaxy, Schitt's Creek, Critical Role, Master of None, Deutschland 83, Lip Sync Battle, F is for Family, The Man in the High Castle and Superstore; Super Bowl XLIX breaks the record for most-watched program in the history of American television; Mayweather–Pacquiao boxing match is history's biggest pay-per-view fight; Sling TV is founded; Amazon Instant Video becomes Amazon Video; Steve Harvey hosts the Miss Universe 2015 pageant in Las Vegas and mistakenly names the first runner-up, Miss Colombia (Ariadna Gutiérrez) as the winner, announcing shortly after that he had read the results incorrectly and that Miss Philippines (Pia Wurtzbach) was the new Miss Universe; ten are killed during a helicopter crash during filming of reality series Dropped.
 2016: First broadcast of The Haunted House, Stranger Things, My Hero Academia, The Night Of, The Loud House, Elena of Avalor, Bizaardvark, The Lion Guard, Fleabag, War & Peace, Roots, Mann Mayal, Chhoti Anandi, Atlanta, This Is Us, The Good Place, Full Frontal with Samantha Bee, MatPat's Game Lab, Escape the Night, American Housewife, American Crime Story, Insecure, Degrassi: Next Class, Westworld, Tales of Arcadia, Victoria, Ben 10, The Crown, and Fuller House; Amazon Prime Video is launched worldwide (except for Mainland China, Cuba, Iran, North Korea, and Syria), expanding its reach beyond the United States; ABC Family is re-launched as Freeform; Beam is launched and is bought by Microsoft in the same year. The last known company in the world to manufacture VHS equipment (VCR/DVD combos), Funai of Japan, ceases production, citing shrinking demand and difficulties procuring parts.
 2017: First broadcast of Money Heist, American Gods, Riverdale, Big Little Lies, Young Sheldon, Star Trek: Discovery, DuckTales (2017), Tangled: The Series (later known as Rapunzel's Tangled Adventure), Marvel's Spider-Man, Miss Kobayashi's Dragon Maid, Hanazuki: Full of Treasures, The Marvelous Mrs. Maisel, The End of the F***ing World, Big Mouth, Bill Nye Saves the World, Mind Field, The Handmaid's Tale, GLOW, Counterpart, Legion, A Series of Unfortunate Events, and Petscop; At the 89th Academy Awards, the film Moonlight is announced the correct winner for Best Picture, after actors Faye Dunaway and Warren Beatty announce La La Land, another acclaimed film, the winner by mistake on national television; Sprout is rebranded as Universal Kids; Beam is renamed to Mixer.
 2018: First broadcast of Cobra Kai, Hilda, The Circle, Bluey, Tom Clancy's Jack Ryan, Craig of the Creek, Barry, Killing Eve, Bodyguard, Pose, Succession, She-Ra and the Princesses of Power, Big City Greens, Total DramaRama, Disenchantment, The Last O.G., Narcos: Mexico, A.P. Bio, Kidding, Lodge 49, Patriot Act with Hasan Minhaj, Carpool Karaoke, Cloak & Dagger, Final Space, Forever, Pop Team Epic, Homecoming, Manifest, Grown-ish, Splitting Up Together, and The Kids Are Alright; Velocity is rebranded as Motor Trend; millions watch Prince Harry marry Meghan Markle.
 2019: First broadcast of Demon Slayer: Kimetsu no Yaiba, Love, Death & Robots, Chernobyl, The Mandalorian, Harley Quinn, Victor and Valentino, Watchmen, His Dark Materials, Hazbin Hotel, Amphibia, Planet Slow Mo, The Masked Singer, Mao Mao: Heroes of Pure Heart, The Boys, All Elite Wrestling: Dynamite, Russian Doll, The Dark Crystal: Age of Resistance, Green Eggs and Ham, The Umbrella Academy, Euphoria, Ramy, The Casagrandes, What We Do in the Shadows, The Other Two, Amphibia, Boy Girl Dog Cat Mouse Cheese, Undone, Black Monday, Hanna, Sex Education, When They See Us, The Promised Neverland, Dr. Stone, Carmen Sandiego, Good Omens, The Morning Show, Mixed-ish and Schooled; the second incarnation of Viacom and the second incarnation of CBS Corporation merge to form ViacomCBS Inc.; The Walt Disney Company launches its streaming service, Disney+; HBO Max is launched.

2020s
 2020: First broadcast of Tiger King, Ted Lasso, Zoey's Extraordinary Playlist, Avenue 5, I May Destroy You, Stargirl, Dispatches from Elsewhere, The Owl House, Side Hustle, The Great, Dash & Lily, Solar Opposites, Central Park, Close Enough and Utopia Falls; the COVID-19 pandemic shuts down production on many television programs; ABS-CBN franchise renewal controversy in the Philippines; Peacock is launched. TVING is launched.
 2021: First broadcast of Squid Game, Invincible, Girls5eva, Hacks, The Ghost and Molly McGee, Reservation Dogs, That Girl Lay Lay, Only Murders in the Building, Abbott Elementary, It's a Sin, Mandela Catalogue, and the first of the Marvel Cinematic Universe Disney+ shows; Paramount+ is launched. 
 2022: First broadcast of Severance, Dancing with Myself, Chainsaw Man, Hamster & Gretel, Smiling Friends, The Baby, Don't Hug Me I'm Scared, All American: Homecoming, and Becoming A Popstar; billions watch the state funeral of Elizabeth II, speculated to be the most watched television event in history  
 2023: First broadcast of Hazbin Hotel, The Last of Us.

See also 
 List of years in film
 List of years in animation
 Table of years in radio
 Timeline of the BBC
 Timeline of the introduction of television in countries
 List of web television series
 List of years in American television
 List of years in Australian television
 List of years in Austrian television
 List of years in Belgian television
 List of years in Brazilian television
 List of years in British television
 List of years in Canadian television
 List of years in Croatian television
 List of years in Czech television
 List of years in Danish television
 List of years in Dutch television
 List of years in Estonian television
 List of years in French television
 List of years in German television
 List of years in Greek television
 List of years in Hong Kong television
 List of years in Indian television
 List of years in Indonesian television
 List of years in Irish television
 List of years in Israeli television
 List of years in Italian television
 List of years in Japanese television
 List of years in Mexican television
 List of years in New Zealand television
 List of years in Norwegian television
 List of years in Pakistani television
 List of years in Philippine television
 List of years in Polish television
 List of years in Portuguese television
 List of years in Scottish television
 List of years in Singapore television
 List of years in South African television
 List of years in South Korean television
 List of years in Spanish television
 List of years in Swedish television
 List of years in Thai television
 List of years in Turkish television

References

Culture-related timelines
Years
Timelines by year
Lists of years by topic